Arion simrothi is a species of air-breathing land slug, a terrestrial pulmonate gastropod mollusk in the family Arionidae, the round-back slugs.

Distribution
This species is found only in Germany.

References

Arion (gastropod)
Molluscs of Europe
Endemic fauna of Germany
Taxonomy articles created by Polbot